Chengala is a town in the Kasaragod district of Kerala, India.

Demographics

Major Organizations
 Zainab College, Cherkkala
 LBS Engineering College, Kasaragod

See also
 Kasaragod
 Kanhangad
 Cherkala
 Badiyadka
 Chattanchal

References

Suburbs of Kasaragod